Jana Polakovičová (born June 28, 1961) is a Czechoslovak sprint canoer who competed in the early 1980s. At the 1980 Summer Olympics in Moscow, she was eliminated in the semifinals of both the K-1 500 m and the K-2 500 m events.

References
Sports-Reference.com profile

1961 births
Canoeists at the 1980 Summer Olympics
Czechoslovak female canoeists
Living people
Olympic canoeists of Czechoslovakia